Philip Ettinger is an American actor who first gained attention for his supporting role as the troubled environmental activist, Michael, in Paul Schrader's First Reformed (2017). Other significant roles have been as Garrett Drimmer in the CBS All Access series One Dollar (2018), as the young-adult version of Mark Ruffalo's twin characters, Dominick and Thomas Birdsey, in HBO's I Know This Much is True in 2020, and in the lead role of Cole Freeman, in Braden King’s cinematic adaptation of the Carter Sickels novel The Evening Hour (2020).

Early life
Philip Ettinger was born September 8, 1985 to a Jewish family in Fair Lawn, New Jersey. He attended Fair Lawn High School, where he was a member of the Masques drama club. He began studying film directing at Emerson College, Boston, Massachusetts. After unexpectedly winning the lead role in a play his freshman year, however, he enrolled in a summer acting program at William Esper Studio, New York City, where a teacher encouraged Ettinger to transfer to the Mason Gross School of the Arts at Rutgers University in New Brunswick, New Jersey. This course included spending a year in England studying at the Globe Theatre in London. He graduated with a Bachelor of Fine Arts degree.

Acting career 
Philip Ettinger, whose professional career began in 2008, in an episode of Law & Order: Special Victims Unit.

In 2014, Ettinger was nominated for a Lucille Lortel Award for Outstanding Featured Actor in a Play, for his work in Joshua Harmon's Bad Jews. (The awards are to recognize excellence in New York Off-Broadway Theatre). Ettinger starred alongside Ethan Hawke and Amanda Seyfried in the supporting role of Michael, the troubled husband of Seyfried's character, Mary, in Paul Schrader's film First Reformed, which was premiered at the 2017 Toronto Film Festival.  The performance was a breakthrough for the actor; so much so, that the LA Times film critic, Justin Chang stated in an article (regarding his personal choices for what should land on the 2018 Oscar nomination ballot), "When lead performances sneak into the wrong categories, it makes it all the harder for an organization to recognize a genuinely supporting turn — like, for example, Ettinger’s galvanizing work in First Reformed, which lasts all of one scene and continues to stay with me.." Ettinger continued to make strides in 2018, starring as Garrett Drimmer, a young steel mill worker raising a toddler on his own, in the CBS All Access ensemble series One Dollar, and appearing in the Sebastián Silva-directed film Tyrel, which premiered at the 2018 Sundance Film Festival.

In 2020, Ettinger landing the role of playing the 17 - 19 year-old versions of Mark Ruffalo's twin characters, Dominick Birdsey and his paranoid schizophrenic twin, Thomas, in HBO's I Know This Much is True, to considerable critical notice, with Dan Seddon of NME noting, "Actor Philip Ettinger (among the series' supporting players) makes a case for himself too, whose stint as the college-aged twins during flashbacks is a raw and fascinating portrayal of the Birdseys complicated youth." Vanity Fair's Richard Lawson examined Ettinger and star Mark Ruffalo's collaboration on the twins with favor, "The relationship between Dom and Thomas is drawn with aching clarity, one brother trying to be good to the other while resentments build up around them. Crucially, neither Ruffalo nor Ettinger overplay Thomas’s condition. Though he is volatile, and frustrating, and wounded, there is nothing childlike about him, really—at least not in the style of so many misbegotten depictions of mental illness on screen... In the other role, Ruffalo and Ettinger both keenly express Dom’s agony over his assumed responsibilities and all they deny him in his own life. It’s particularly heartbreaking to watch Ettinger’s youthful appetite for escape dissipate as he realizes just how serious his brother’s situation is, how much time and attention and patience it will require. I Know This Much Is True is wise enough to both regret and accept that onus, gradually allowing Dom to find the ragged purpose in a life he feels has been robbed of that very thing. Ruffalo communicates that hopeful resignation quite well, building on Ettinger’s more wide-eyed performance to craft a man in full." Haaretz's Adrian Hennigan pointed out Ettinger's success in portraying both twins, "The actors (including Donnie and Rocco Masihi) playing the younger versions of the twins are also outstanding: Philip Ettinger subtly delineates how these identical twins are very different characters..."

Earlier that year Philip Ettinger attended both the 2020 Sundance Film Festival and the International Film Festival Rotterdam, in the Netherlands, to promote his first lead role, (that of Cole Freeman), in Braden King’s cinematic adaptation of the Carter Sickels novel The Evening Hour. In it, Ettinger depicts a young nursing home aid struggling to support himself, and his grandparents, in economically depressed Appalachia, by buying excess pain meds from members of his West Virginian community, and reselling them to others in that same area.  The film is slated for a 2021 release. Future projects to be screened and/or filmed are Ian Barling's short film Safe, which premiered at La Semaine de la Critique at Cannes in July 2021, the recently completed short Hold Up by writer-director Alex Rollins Berg, and Little Brother, an indie film written and directed by Sheridan O'Donnell.

Filmography

Film

Television

Theatre

Awards and nominations

References

External links 
 
 Philip Ettinger Instagram
 Philip Ettinger CBS interview
 Content Mode Interview with Philip Ettinger
Sitting in the Undefined:  Philip Ettinger on The Evening Hour - Roger Ebert.com
Mark Ruffalo Interviews Philip Ettinger about I Know This Much is True - Interview magazine

Living people
21st-century American actors
Mason Gross School of the Arts alumni
People from Fair Lawn, New Jersey
Jewish American male actors
Male actors from New Jersey
American male film actors
American male musical theatre actors
American male television actors
1985 births